Mtera Dam is a hydroelectric dam in Tanzania. The dam is located midway between Iringa and Dodoma on the border between the Iringa Region and the Dodoma Region. The travel time from Dodoma is about two hours on a tarmac road.

Overview
Mtera Dam is a large hydroelectric dam in Tanzania. It measures  at full capacity. It was built from 1975 to 1979 for the purpose of regulating water level at the downstream at the Ruaha installed Kidatu Hydro-electric Dam.

Ecology 
The lake is considered to be one of the best places in Tanzania to observe birds, since there are approximately one million dead trees in it and it has many shallow areas. In addition, the waters are rich in fish. In the early 1990s about 5000 tonnes of fish were caught in the lake.

See also

List of hydropower stations in Africa
List of power stations in Tanzania

References

Öhman, May-Britt,
Taming Exotic Beauties: Swedish Hydro Power Constructions in Tanzania in the Era of Development Assistance, 1960s - 1990s, Stockholm, 2007, PhD Thesis, 
http://www.diva-portal.org/smash/record.jsf?pid=diva2:12267

External links
Tanesco Website

Dams completed in 1979
Energy infrastructure completed in 1979
Dams in Tanzania
Hydroelectric power stations in Tanzania
Buildings and structures in the Iringa Region
Buildings and structures in the Dodoma Region
Important Bird Areas of Tanzania